Alireza Rezaei (born July 11, 1976) is a former Iranian wrestler Iran's first heavyweight medalist in the 2004 Olympics who competed in the Men's Freestyle 120 kg at the 2004 Summer Olympics and won the silver medal. He is currently Executive director of Iranian national team.

External links
 
 

1976 births
Living people
Iranian male sport wrestlers
Olympic wrestlers of Iran
Wrestlers at the 2004 Summer Olympics
Olympic silver medalists for Iran
Asian Games gold medalists for Iran
Olympic medalists in wrestling
Asian Games medalists in wrestling
Wrestlers at the 1998 Asian Games
Medalists at the 2004 Summer Olympics
World Wrestling Championships medalists
Medalists at the 1998 Asian Games
20th-century Iranian people
21st-century Iranian people